Savinovo is a rural locality (a selo) in Sokolovsky Selsoviet, Zonalny District, Altai Krai, Russia. The population was 539 as of 2013. There are 6 streets.

Geography 
Savinovo is located 26 km southwest of Zonalnoye (the district's administrative centre) by road. Zhavoronkovo is the nearest rural locality.

References 

Rural localities in Zonalny District